Footscray City Films was a film school in Melbourne, Australia situated within the campus of Footscray City College

Overview
Established in 1981 the school enrols around 80 students each year and provides qualifications based on the National Industry Training Package in Screen and Media in Certificate IV, Diploma and Advanced Diploma. Students enrolled at the film school work on a minimum of 20 films a year.
Graduates of Footscray City Films have gone on to have successful careers in the Australian Film Industry

Notable alumni 
Adrian Ortega - Film director, "Cerulean Blue" 
Timothy Spanos - Film Writer/Director, "Boronia Boys" 
Cameron Nugent - Film Writer/Director, "A Boy Called Sailboat"
Amiel Courtin-Wilson - Film director
Megan Spencer - Documentary film maker, journalist and radio presenter
Timothy Grucza - Emmy award-winning cameraman and documentary film maker

References 

Film schools in Australia
Australian vocational education and training providers
Australian tertiary institutions
Educational institutions established in 1981
1981 establishments in Australia